The Royal Historical Society of Victoria is a community organisation promoting the history of the state of Victoria, Australia.  It functions to promote and research the history of that state after settlement, and as an umbrella organisation for more than 300 affiliated societies. It is operated by volunteers, and has a claimed membership of 1200.

The Society was founded in 1909 and celebrated its Centenary in 2009.  It is responsible for the biannual Victorian Historical Journal and other publications. Exhibitions, community or government advisory functions and lectures are also its primary activities, and it has research facilities for members and the community. The Society administers the Victorian Community History Awards in partnership with Public Record Office Victoria, and is a constituent member of the Federation of Australian Historical Societies.

Publications 
 History News, ISSN 1326-2696   Six issues per year. This can be downloaded from the RHSV website.
 Victorian Historical Journal, ISSN 1030-7710  Two issues per year.

Fellows 
Fellows of the Royal Historical Society of Victoria include
 Marnie Bassett
 Weston Bate
 Geoffrey Blainey
 John Lack
 Noel Fulford Learmonth
 Andrew Lemon
 Ian McLaren
 John Kinmont Moir
 Joyce Nicholson
 Gary Presland
 Marjorie Tipping
 A. G. L. Shaw

A Fellow of the RHSV is entitled to use the post nominal letters FRHSV.

See also 
 List of Australian organisations with royal patronage

References

Further reading 
 Victorian Historical Journal: Centenary Issue, Volume 80, Number 2.  Royal Historical Society of Victoria.  Melbourne: November 2009.  This issue contains several articles on the history and role of the RHSV.

External links 
 

History of Victoria (Australia)
Organisations based in Victoria (Australia)
Historical societies of Australia
Organisations based in Australia with royal patronage